Fainu'ulelei Filipo David Saena (born 6 June 1966 in Apia) is a Samoan former rugby union player. He plays as a fly-half.

Career
Saena first played for Western Samoa in a test match against Tonga at Apia, on May 28, 1988. He was part of the 1991 Rugby World Cup roster. His last match for the Manu Samoa was against Fiji at Apia on June 5, 1993.

Notes

External links

Filipo D. Saena at New Zealand Rugby History

1966 births
Sportspeople from Apia
Living people
Samoan rugby union players
Rugby union fly-halves
Samoa international rugby union players